Traditional derby also known as the West-Slovakia derby is the name for the rivalry between the two Slovak football teams ŠK Slovan Bratislava and FC Spartak Trnava. The two teams are the most successful clubs in Slovakia. The game is considered the most prestigious match in the Slovak football calendar.

Honours

Statistics 

Note: Only official domestic league games since 1939 are included.

Results

League

Cup

Head-to-head league ranking
Slovakia (1993–present)

Source: rsssf.com

Czechoslovakia (1947–1993)

Source: rsssf.com

Players who played for both clubs

Notes

References

External links 
H2H Comparison at Soccerway.com (from 2002)

Football derbies in Slovakia
ŠK Slovan Bratislava
FC Spartak Trnava
1926 establishments in Slovakia